The following is a list of major crimes in Singapore that happened before 2000. They are arranged in chronological order.

1950s

1950
 29 June 1950: Winnie Annie Spencer, a ten-year-old schoolgirl, was found dead at the beach near Labrador Park. An autopsy revealed that she had been raped and strangled to death. 25-year-old Joseph Michael Nonis was arrested and charged with the murder of Spencer. At the trial starting on 24 October 1950, despite having signed a confession, Nonis insisted on going on the stand, where he claimed that he was innocent and that he had been tortured by Chief Inspector J. Rayney, who had forced him to pen down and sign the confession of how he killed Spencer. He also testified he was afraid of Rayney, who was notorious for using torture to extract confessions from suspects during and after the Japanese Occupation of Singapore (one of them suffered from brain damage as a result of the torture). David Marshall, the lawyer who represented Nonis, called in witnesses who had been tortured by Rayney to testify in court. All of Nonis's family members and acquaintances also testified that Nonis was seen at home on the same night when Spencer was murdered, which supported Nonis's alibi defence. A psychiatrist was also called in to assess Nonis's character and the confession written by Nonis. The psychiatrist said in court that such a confession could only be written by an individual of psychopathic behaviour, and Nonis's true character did not fit that of a psychopath. After a trial lasting nine days, in view of the evidence, the seven-men jury found Nonis not guilty of murder and as a result, Nonis was discharged and acquitted of murder. , the rape and murder of Spencer remains unsolved, and the murderer(s) was never found. In the aftermath, Rayney resigned from the police force and he died in 1986 at the age of 82, while Nonis eventually immigrated to England more than a decade later, and finally to Spain, where he lived until his death before 2002.
 11–13 December 1950: 13-year-old Dutch-Eurasian girl Maria Hertogh was adopted by Che Aminah binte Mohammad in 1943 and raised as a Muslim under the name Nadra binte Ma'arof. In April 1950, the Hertoghs, through the Dutch Consulate in Singapore, applied to the High Court to regain custody of their daughter. On 1 August 1950, Maria Hertogh entered an arrangement, regarded as a valid marriage from an Islamic perspective, to marry 21-year-old Mansoor Adabi. On 2 December 1950, High Court judge T. A. Brown ruled that the marriage was illegal and awarded custody of Maria Hertogh to her biological parents. The ruling sparked outrage from the Muslim community in Singapore and led to riots that killed 18 people, including police officers and civilians. Hundreds of rioters were arrested, prosecuted and jailed for rioting; nine of them were even given the death penalty for murder. In 1959, after the Malaysian government intervened, the convicted rioters on death row had their sentences commuted to life imprisonment and they were all subsequently pardoned and released from prison.

1960s

1960 
 April 1960: 49-year-old "Biscuit King" Lee Gee Chong, chairman of the Thye Hong biscuit factory in Johor, was being driven by his chauffeur to his residence in Garlick Avenue when another car forced his car onto an embankment. Three men then pulled him out of his car and into their own and abducted him. Lee Gee Chong was the son of Lee Choon Seng, a former president of SCCCI and chairman of OCBC Bank. Five days after the kidnapping, Lee Gee Chong's dead body was found wrapped in a blanket at a graveyard in Yio Chu Kang. He had died of severe head injuries. It was not reported whether a ransom had been paid. In July 1965, Lee Gee Chong's son, Lee Boon Leong, was ambushed while he was driving and shot in the shoulder. However, his attackers fled when they saw that he had a gun too. Lee Boon Leong, then in his 30s, survived the encounter.
 July 1960: 60-year-old C. K. Tang, the founder of the department store Tangs at Orchard Road, was kidnapped outside his bungalow in St Thomas Walk at 7:15 am in full view of children heading to a nearby school. Tang was released four days later after a S$150,000 ransom was paid. One of the kidnappers was Loh Ngut Fong (卢岳鹏), a notorious gang leader who was also behind several other kidnappings in that era. Loh was eventually killed on 11 November 1968 at his hideout in St Heliers Avenue after a seven-hour shootout against police and Gurkha forces.

1961 
 May 1961: 48-year-old shipping tycoon Tay Kie Thay was ambushed while in his car outside his bungalow at Katong. The gunmen forced his chauffeur out of the car before hijacking it and driving to Broadrick Road, where they transferred to another car. Tay's family paid a S$130,000 ransom but Tay did not return home safely. A few months later, it was discovered that Tay had been shot dead and buried in a vacant plot of land in Tampines.

1963 
 12 July 1963: The Pulau Senang prison riot occurred at the experimental-type offshore penal colony. A group of 70 to 90 inmates, led by Tan Kheng Ann, started a riot which destroyed and burned everything the inmates had built on Pulau Senang. During the riot, prison officer Daniel Stanley Dutton and his three assistants – Arumugan Veerasingham, Tan Kok Hian and Chok Kok Hong – were murdered by the rioters. About 58 men were accused of murder and rioting; the others received jail terms for rioting. During the five-month trial, David Marshall represented the accused in court. Eventually, 18 men, including Tan Kheng Ann, were convicted of murder and hanged in Changi Prison on 29 October 1965. Another 29 men were found guilty of rioting – among them, 11 were sentenced to two years' jail for rioting while the other 18 received three years' jail for rioting with deadly weapons. The remaining 11 men were acquitted and freed.
 27 August 1963: 22-year-old Jenny Cheok Cheng Kid had disappeared in the sea during a scuba-diving trip in the straits between Sisters' Islands. Sixteen months later, her boyfriend, then 24-year-old Sunny Ang Soo Suan, was arrested and charged with murder based on circumstantial evidence such as his eligibility to claim insurance for her death, as well as his strangely calm behaviour towards her disappearance. On 18 May 1965, by a unanimous decision, the seven-men jury found Ang guilty of murder; Ang was thus sentenced to death by High Court judge Murray Buttrose. After failing in his appeals to the Court of Appeal and the Privy Council, and after the rejection of his clemency petition by President Yusof bin Ishak, Ang was hanged on 6 February 1967. Cheok's body was never found.

1964 
 5 February 1964: 31-year-old Vee Ming Shaw, the eldest son of Shaw Organisation founder Run Run Shaw, was kidnapped at gunpoint at Andrew Road on his way to work. The kidnappers also abducted his chauffeur, 45-year-old Mundari bin Iklal. Shaw and Mundari were released 12 days later after the Shaw family paid a ransom of S$250,000.
 November 1964: 44-year-old rubber magnate Ng Quee Lam was ambushed and abducted by four or five armed youths when he arrived in his limousine at Kee Choe Avenue to pick up a friend for dinner. A fortnight later, Ng was released after his family paid a S$400,000 ransom.

1965 
 10 March 1965: In an incident known as the MacDonald House bombing, three Indonesian marines – 23-year-old Usman bin Haji Muhammad Ali, 21-year-old Harun bin Said and Gani bin Arup – initiated an explosion at the MacDonald House along Orchard Road during the Indonesia–Malaysia confrontation. The bombing caused the deaths of three people – 43-year-old Mohammed Yasin Kesit, 20-year-old Juliet Goh Hwa Kuang and 39-year-old Elizabeth Suzie Choo Kway Hoi – and injured at least 33 people. Gani managed to escape capture, while Usman and Harun were arrested and charged with murder. They were eventually found guilty of murder and sentenced to death by High Court judge F. A. Chua. On 17 October 1968, more than three years after the bombing, the two men were hanged in Changi Prison. In retaliation, 400 students in Jakarta burnt the Singapore flag and attacked the Singapore embassy. Singapore–Indonesia relations improved in 1973 after Singaporean prime minister Lee Kuan Yew visited Indonesia and scattered flowers on the two marines' graves. In February 2014, bilateral ties between Singapore and Indonesia were strained after the Indonesian Navy named a warship after the two marines, prompting Singapore to suspend inter-military relations with Indonesia. Indonesia eventually made an apology but said that it would not reverse its move on naming the warship after the two marines. In response, Singapore accepted the apology and said that it would resume inter-military relations with Indonesia.

1968 
 24 May 1968: 19-year-old Ong Beang Leck was last seen alive by his father when he left his father's shop. Later on, Ong's father received two separate phone calls on 26 May and 5 June, in which the caller claimed he had kidnapped Ong and demanded a ransom from Ong's father to free his son. A ransom of S$20,000 was eventually negotiated and paid, but still, there was no sign of Ong. A week after the ransom was paid, a rental car owner found one of the cars he rented out three weeks before had a foul-smelling odour. Tests revealed that the smell was that of blood. The person who last rented the car was 22-year-old Richard Lai Choon Seng. Lai confessed that he, along with four others, was part of a kidnapping, in which the victim was Ong. Lai also stated that he took part in the plan as he needed money to save his failing business, and that he thought the plan was to lure Ong into the rental car, render him unconscious and hold him hostage until the ransom was paid. However, on the night of 24 May 1968, as soon as Ong entered the car, Lai saw three of his four other accomplices use weapons to attack Ong, leading to Ong's death. This revelation led to the arrest of the other four accomplices; one of them was Ong's 24-year-old close friend Lee Chor Pet, the others were 29-year-old Chow Sien Cheong, 32-year-old Lim Kim Kwee, and 23-year-old Ho Kee Fatt. Lim and Ho had escaped to Malaysia before they were arrested by Malaysian police and extradited to Singapore. Lee led the police to a manhole in Jurong, where Ong's highly decomposed body was found. Lee, Lim and Ho, who attacked Ong from the back of the car, were charged with murder. On 11 June 1970, High Court judges A. V. Winslow and D. C. D'Cotta found the trio guilty of murder and sentenced them to death; the three men were hanged in Changi Prison on 27 January 1973. Lai, who became the prosecution's main witness against the three murder defendants, was subsequently jailed for four years for his involvement in both the ransom negotiation and the abduction of Ong. For possessing the ransom money, Chow was also given a four-year jail sentence as well.

1969 
 26 March 1969: A group of four men, armed with guns and knives, entered a shophouse in Sims Avenue and robbed Chow Sow Lin, a mother of two, of her jewellery and money. When they left the shophouse, the robbers were chased by a mob led by the shophouse owner, who had been alerted of the armed robbery by someone in the shophouse. During their escape, one of the four robbers – 36-year-old Teo Cheng Leong – was separated from his group so he hid in an empty hut in Lorong 39, Geylang. The police, who had been alerted by the mob, arrived at the hut where Teo was hiding. Teo suddenly came out of the hut and fired two shots at Inspector Desmond D'Oliveiro, the police officer nearest to the hut, but the shots missed him. After Teo retreated back into the hut, the police fired tear gas into the hut. Teo eventually came out and surrendered to the police. Within the next four days, two of Teo's accomplices – 26-year-old Khoo Meng Hwa and 31-year-old Ng Chwee Bock – were arrested. Khoo and Ng were later each sentenced to ten years' imprisonment for armed robbery. Teo, who stood trial in February 1970 for armed robbery and discharging a firearm twice, was found guilty and sentenced to death for the latter offence. On 21 October 1970, the court dismissed Teo's appeal against his death sentence. Teo was the first person in Singapore's legal history to be tried for a capital case before two judges in the High Court and also the first person to be sentenced to death following the abolishment of jury trials in January 1970. The fourth robber was never caught.

1970s

1970
 6 January 1970: 31-year-old dance hostess Mimi Wong Weng Siu and her 37-year-old ex-husband, Sim Woh Kum, murdered 33-year-old Japanese national Watanabe Ayako, the wife of Wong's lover, Watanabe Hiroshi. The murder was witnessed by the Watanabes' nine-year-old daughter Chieko, who came to Singapore with her mother and two siblings to visit her father. Watanabe Hiroshi, an engineer, had an affair with Wong for three years. After his wife found out about the affair, Watanabe wanted to end the affair but Wong was unwilling to. Filled with jealousy, Wong then asked for help from Sim, with whom she bore two sons, to help her in the murder. At the trial, both Wong and Sim accused each other of masterminding the murder, with Wong even putting up a defence of diminished responsibility. Wong's psychiatrist, Wong Yip Chong, also claimed that she had caught the Japanese encephalitis virus from Watanabe Hiroshi and thus suffered from a viral brain infection at the time of the killing. However, the prosecution's psychiatrist found that she was not suffering from any condition. After a trial lasting 26 days, on 7 December 1970, Wong and Sim were found guilty of murder and sentenced to death by High Court judges Tan Ah Tah and Choor Singh. Their subsequent appeals to the Court of Appeal and pleas for clemency to President Benjamin Sheares were rejected. On the morning of 27 July 1973, they were hanged in Changi Prison. Wong was the first woman to be executed in Singapore for murder since the country gained independence in 1965.

1971
 29 December 1971: In a case known as the Gold Bars Triple Murders, 55-year-old businessman Ngo Cheng Poh and his two employees, 57-year-old Ang Boon Chai and 51-year-old Leong Chin Woo, were murdered by a group of ten men. The group had also robbed the three men of 120 gold bars worth S$500,000. This robbery-murder was masterminded by 25-year-old Andrew Chou Hock Guan, a former business associate of Ngo, and several other gold bar syndicates smuggling gold bars from Vietnam into Singapore through the Vietnamese flights bound for Singapore. Chou, who started this job in early 1971, later lost the trust of the syndicates when he lost US$235,000, the money meant for the syndicates' funding in the business. Frustrated with the loss of trust from the syndicates, Chou hatched a plan to rob one of the syndicates still in contact with him. He engaged his 34-year-old elder brother David Chou Hock Heng, and two friends – 24-year-old Peter Lim Swee Guan and 25-year-old Augustine Ang Cheng Siong – to plan the robbery-murder. Six youths – 19-year-old Alex Yau Hean Thye, 20-year-old Stephen Francis, 18-year-old Richard James, 18-year-old Konesekaram s/o Nagalingam, 16-year-old Stephen Lee Hock Khoon, and 16-year-old Ringo Lee Chiew Chwee – were hired by Lim and Ang to commit the crime with a promised reward of S$20,000 to each of them. The group of ten were later arrested and charged with murder, while the stolen gold bars were later recovered by the police. Among the ten, only Ang confessed to his role in the robbery-murder. Ang was thus given a discharge not amounting to an acquittal. For his involvement in the murder, Ang was detained indefinitely without trial for more than 10 years before being released. Ang later became the prosecution's key witness against all the nine accused persons, who pleaded not guilty to the triple murder charges. Additionally, the Chou brothers also asserted that Ang was the mastermind of the robbery-murder, while the others claimed they only helped to dispose or transport the bodies. After a trial lasting around 40 days, on 4 December 1972, High Court judges Choor Singh and F. A. Chua rejected the testimonies of all the nine defendants but accepted that the prosecution witness, Ang, was telling the truth, determining Chou as the mastermind and the equal roles played by all nine in the triple murder. All were found guilty of murder. Out of the nine accused, seven of them (including the Chou brothers) were sentenced to death. The two remaining people – Stephen Lee and Ringo Lee – escaped the death penalty as they were both under the age of 18 at the time of the murders; both of them were detained indefinitely under the President's Pleasure. The subsequent appeals made by the seven condemned to the Court of Appeal and the Privy Council against their sentences (in which their respective lawyers argued that Ang's testimony should not be trusted); and their pleas to President Benjamin Sheares for clemency all met with failure. On 28 February 1975, the seven men were hanged in Changi Prison.

1972
 22–23 April 1972: In a case known as the Pulau Ubin murder, 25-year-old Harun bin Ripin and 19-year-old Mohamed Yasin bin Hussin barged into the home of 58-year-old Poon Sai Imm at Pulau Ubin and robbed her. During the robbery, when Harun went around the house to look for valuables to steal, Yasin restrained Poon and tried to rape her. While trying to rape Poon, Yasin sat on her chest and caused her ribs to fracture, and these fractures ultimately caused Poon's death. The two men then disposed of Poon's body in the sea before returning to mainland Singapore; Poon's body was discovered by a fisherman the following morning. Nine months later, when he was arrested for another crime, Harun surprised the police by confessing to his involvement in the robbery. Harun's confession led to Yasin's arrest, and the two men were charged with Poon's murder. On 15 March 1974, High Court judges Choor Singh and A. V. Winslow found Harun guilty of robbery by night and sentenced him to 12 years' jail and 12 strokes of the cane; Yasin was found guilty of murder and sentenced to death. Although Yasin's appeal against his sentence was rejected by the Court of Appeal in November 1974, his appeal to the Privy Council was accepted and he was sentenced to two years' jail for committing a rash/negligent act not amounting to culpable homicide. However, Yasin was brought back to court again and promptly charged with rape. At the trial on 11 May 1977, Yasin denied raping Poon despite the forensic evidence presented by the prosecution and Harun's testimony against him. At the end of the trial on 12 May 1977, Yasin was found guilty of attempted rape and sentenced to eight years' imprisonment.
 9 August 1972: During the morning of Singapore's National Day, after a drinks session, at Amoy Street, 42-year-old wine shop owner Chew Liew Tea was shot and killed by two Penang-born Chinese Malaysians who tried to rob him. The two robbers - 28-year-old Neoh Bean Chye and 23-year-old Lim Kim Huat - fled to Penang, Malaysia after the crime, but they were both being arrested by the Malaysian authorities and being sent back to Singapore, where they were charged with the murder of Chew Liew Tea. It was revealed in the trial that Lim was the one who used a revolver to shoot Chew to death and Neoh was the one who provided Lim with the fully-loaded revolver prior to their robbery attempt; for this, it was argued by the prosecution that while it was not their plan to kill Chew, Lim fired the gun in furtherance of their common intention to commit robbery and Neoh should be held liable given they had premeditated using the gun to facilitate their crime and use violence if necessary. On 8 November 1973, the High Court's two judges - D. C. D'Cotta and Choor Singh - accepted the prosecution's arguments and thus sentenced both Neoh and Lim to death for murder after rejecting the two men's defences of accidental shooting and lack of intention to cause death. Neoh and Lim were both hanged on 27 June 1975 after the failure of their appeals against the sentence.
 18 September 1972: 22-year-old Malaysian citizen Chan Chee Chan was walking with her sister along Queen's Circus on the way to her home in Tanglin Halt when she suddenly screamed and collapsed after being shot in the chest. She never regained consciousness and died in Singapore General Hospital. The bullet extracted from her wound was of .22 calibre. , the case remains unsolved.
 24 November 1972: 32-year-old Lim Ban Lim, a gangster who killed 27-year-old police corporal Koh Chong Thye on 23 June 1968, was ambushed by police officers near Golden City Theatre in Queenstown. The officers shot Lim three times in his body in a firefight, killing him. Lim's right-hand-man, Chua Ah Kow, shot himself dead during a gunfight three weeks later at Tank Road.

1974
 9 May 1974: 44-year-old Sim Joo Keow strangled her 53-year-old sister-in-law Quek Lee Eng over S$2,000, before dismembering her body and keeping her torso in two earthen jars in her home. Quek's head and arms were found in a parcel near the Kallang River. Sim was sentenced to 10 years in jail in January 1975 after being convicted of culpable homicide not amounting to murder and hiding evidence.
 6 October 1974: 37-year-old Vartharajoo Krishnasamy, a port labourer, was found dead alongside Clementi Road near Kent Ridge university complex. It was ascertained that the death may be related to gang violence. At the time of his death, Vartharajoo left behind a wife, his elderly mother, and four children, including a son Rajoo Mani who most recently appealed to the public for information about his father's death in 2021. As of July 2021, Vartharajoo's killer(s) were never caught.
16 November 1974: Late at night in a shophouse from Serangoon Road, 59-year-old Nadarajah Govindasamy had brutally murdered 29-year-old Mohamed Azad s/o Mohamed Hussein, the fiancé of his youngest daughter Deva Kumari. When Azad's body was found, there are seven fatal wounds on his head. Nadarajah was later arrested and charged with murder. Before the tragic events, Nadarajah was disapproving of Azad as his son-in-law because Azad was an Indian Muslim while Nadarajah and his family were Hindus, only gave in a month after first meeting him. On 20 August 1975, after deliberating over the evidence and submissions from both sides, both the High Court judges – Justice Choor Singh and Justice Frederick Arthur Chua (also known as Justice F. A. Chua) – determined that Nadarajah had intended to cause death from the 7 fatal wounds found on Azad's head, therefore they both rejected Nadarajah's defence of sudden and grave provocation, found him guilty of murder and sentenced him to death. Nadarajah's appeal was dismissed on 17 February 1976 and he was hanged on 28 January 1977.

1975
 25 May 1975: 54-year-old Mohamad Kunjo s/o Ramalan murdered his 54-year-old friend, Arumugam Arunachalam, by hitting him on the head with an exhaust pipe at Pulau Saigon Road. Kunjo was later arrested and charged with murder. Both men were intoxicated at the time of the killing. Forensic pathologist Seah Han Cheow, who performed an autopsy on the body, discovered a high level of alcoholic content inside the victim's blood, leading him to raise a possibility of acute alcoholic poisoning that might have contributed to Arunachalam's death. Kunjo, who raised a defence of intoxication at the time of the commission of the offence, was found guilty of murder and sentenced to death in 1976. After losing his appeals against the death sentence within the next two years, Kunjo filed for clemency through his lawyer in January 1978. Two months later, on 26 March 1978, a Malay newspaper article reported that President Benjamin Sheares accepted the clemency petition, and as a result, Kunjo's death sentence was commuted to life imprisonment. Kunjo was reportedly the first person to receive a presidential pardon from the death sentence since Singapore gained independence in 1965.
 July 1975: Four serial robbers – 40-year-old Suhaymi Harith, 39-year-old Khalil Mohammed Dol, 45-year-old Wassan Sakeebun, and 47-year-old Wagiman Abdullah – were found guilty of their crimes and sentenced by district judge E. C. Foenander to a total of 64 years in jail and 144 strokes of the cane. All four had pleaded guilty to 228 charges of housebreaking, robbery and theft committed between 5 January 1973 and 13 June 1975. They were known as the "Swimming Trunks Gang" because they committed the crimes while they were dressed in only swimming trunks.
 18 December 1975: Bobby Chung Hua Watt was approached by his sister, Patsy Chung, to help her settle marital issues with her abusive and unfaithful husband, Lim Hong Chee. Chung went to his sister's flat in Chai Chee to confront Lim. The confrontation turned violent after Lim and his two brothers treated Chung with disrespect and contempt; Chung killed 23-year-old Lim Hong Kai, one of Lim's two brothers. He was later arrested and charged with murder. In November 1976, Chung, who was married with two daughters before the crime, was found guilty of murder and sentenced to death. He lost his appeal to the Court of Appeal, and was scheduled to be hanged on 18 January 1980. However, on 15 January 1980, a 26-year-old Chung received news that his petition to President Benjamin Sheares for clemency had been accepted. As a result, Chung's death sentence was commuted to life imprisonment. After serving at least two-thirds of his life sentence, Chung was released from prison in May 1993 for good behaviour.

1977
 6 May 1977: 18-year-old Siti Aminah binte Jaffar and 25-year-old Anwar Ali Khan were caught trafficking 43.5 grams of diamorphine, which exceeds the 15 grams that would lead to a death sentence under Singapore law. After both of them were sentenced to death in August 1978, they appealed to President Devan Nair for clemency. The President rejected Anwar's plea so Anwar was eventually hanged in 1983. Siti was granted presidential clemency so her death sentence was commuted to life imprisonment.
10 November 1977: Seven-year-old Usharani Ganaison, the youngest of three daughters in her family, went missing after she last departed her home to buy drinks for the family guests to celebrate Deepavali. However, she never came back and was reported missing. She was found dead the next morning nearby her flat, with signs of being sexually assaulted and strangled to death. A denture mark on the body was later matched to Usharani's uncle Kalidass Sinnathamby Narayanasamy, a 23-year-old lance corporal of the Singapore Armed Forces, who admitted to molesting the girl but he denied that he intentionally killed her. Nonetheless, he was arrested and charged with the murder of his niece. Kalidass was sentenced to death on 27 March 1980 and lost his appeal on 17 May 1982, and he was eventually hanged.

 25 November 1977: Ten-year-old Cheng Geok Ha (钟玉霞), the youngest of twelve children in her family, went missing after she was last seen playing in her Chai Chee neighbourhood with her two Malay friends. According to the Malay brother-sister pair, they last saw Geok Ha after they ended their game and went back home for mealtime. Despite appeals for information after filing a missing persons report, Geok Ha was found dead on 7 December 1977, when a group of four Malay youths playing ball nearby detected a decomposing smell and discovered her body in a manhole, where it was wrapped inside a gunny sack. The police later questioned the neighbours, and arrested one of them: 41-year-old labourer Quek Kee Siong (郭祺祥). Quek, a family friend of the Cheng family, was charged with murder after admitting that he strangled Geok Ha out of accident. However, forensic pathologist Chao Tzee Cheng revealed in Quek's 1979 murder trial that the girl was being intentionally strangled due to extensive fractures on her ribs and neck, and she was also being sexually assaulted before her death. Quek was found guilty of murder, and sentenced to death on 6 March 1979. Quek lost his appeal on 17 November 1980, and he was eventually hanged. A 2005 crime documentary revealed that Geok Ha's mother, who never truly get over her youngest child's death, died several years after her daughter's murder, and after Quek's execution, one of Cheng's elder sisters Cheng Siok Ngee found solace in Buddhist religion and came to forgive Quek despite hating him initially.

1978
 25 April 1978: 18-year-old policeman Lee Kim Lai was abducted by three men – 20-year-old Ong Hwee Kuan, 20-year-old Yeo Ching Boon and 20-year-old Ong Chin Hock – from his sentry post at Mount Vernon and forced into a taxi. They killed him along with the taxi driver, 60-year-old Chew Theng Hin, and took his revolver. On the same night, a police officer, Siew Man Seng, had seen Ong Hwee Kuan and Yeo behaving suspiciously around the area where they had abandoned the taxi. He went out of his car, chased the two men and managed to arrest Ong Hwee Kuan and bring him in for questioning. At the same time of Ong Hwee Kuan's arrest, Lee's body was found inside the abandoned taxi with 15 stab wounds on his body. Later on, the next day, Chew's body was also found in a drain, further linking Ong Hwee Kuan to the double murder. Yeo was later arrested in his flat and the revolver was recovered, together with some bullets. Ong Chin Hock surrendered himself soon after. The three men were eventually convicted of murder on 23 May 1979 and sentenced to death. They were hanged on 24 February 1984.
19 August 1978: Five social escorts – 24-year-old Diana Ng Kum Yim and four Malaysians – 22-year-old Yeng Yoke Fun, 22-year-old Yap Me Leng, 19-year-old Seetoh Tai Thim, and 19-year-old Margaret Ong Guat Choo – were last seen boarding a cargo ship for a party together with three "Japanese" men by a boatman. The five women have gone missing since then and there has been no trace of their whereabouts. Before the mysterious disappearance, the employer of the five women had been approached by one of the three men, who only introduced himself as Wong. Wong, who claimed to be a businessman from Hong Kong, asked for the five women's services. He had brought them to shopping, expensive meals and entertainment. This lasted nine days before the fateful day when Wong invited the women to attend a party on a ship with two associates from Japan. Police investigations showed that Wong's identity, as well as those of his two associates, were fake. Recent theories suggest that North Korea was involved in this matter since there were incidents of North Korean agents abducting citizens from other countries in the same year the five women went missing. Furthermore, in 2005, Charles Robert Jenkins, a United States Army deserter who entered North Korea in 1965, claimed that he had seen one of the five women, Yeng, in an amusement park in Pyongyang in 1980 or 1981. However, despite the renewed interest, there is still no evidence to substantiate this claim. The five missing women were never found.

1979
 6 January 1979: In a case known as the Geylang Bahru family murders, four siblings – ten-year-old Tan Kok Peng, eight-year-old Tan Kok Hin, six-year-old Tan Kok Soon and five-year-old Tan Chin Nee – were found brutally slashed to death in their flat in Geylang Bahru. , the case remains unsolved.
 29 November 1979:  Yong Kwee Kong and Lim Kok Yew, both Malaysian armed robbers and fugitives wanted by both Malaysian and Singaporean police, took three people hostage while exchanging fire with police during the Tiong Bahru bus hijacking, which ended with a wounded Yong committing suicide on the bus and Lim surrendering to the police. He was later hanged for being an accomplice of a person who uses arms while committing a scheduled offence, contrary to  Section 5 of the Arms Offences Act.

1980s

1980
 25 July 1980: 16-year-old student Ong Ai Siok, alias Goh Luan Kheng, who stayed at home to study overnight while her adoptive parents went out for supper, was murdered by her relative Lau Ah Kiang, who was 25 years old and facing financial trouble, which led to Lau committing the murder with the intention to commit robbery. Lau was arrested four days later and it took six years before he was finally brought to trial for Ong's murder. Although Lau confessed to the murder, he denied that he was involved in the robbery but after due consideration, the judges T. S. Sinnathuray and Abdul Wahab Ghows accepted the trial prosecutor Lawrence Ang's arguments and hence found Lau guilty of murder, and sentenced him to death on 21 February 1986.
 3 October 1980: Police Constable Nawi bin Saini and another policeman spotted 25-year-old Malaysian national Seow Lam Seng and his accomplice, 30-year-old Lee Ah Fatt, loitering suspiciously just metres away from a bank along Tanjong Katong Road. When the duo were searched and screened, Lee allegedly drew a pistol and pointed it at the policemen. Nawi then drew his revolver and fired three shots at Lee. Lee continued to struggle with the policemen even though he had been shot; Seow took advantage of the distraction to escape, discarding the pistol as he fled. Lee succumbed to his injuries in hospital, while Seow fled to Malaysia and was on the run for 38 years. On 22 March 2018, a 63-year-old Seow was nabbed in Penang by the Royal Malaysia Police and extradited to Singapore two days later. On 26 March 2018, he was charged with unlawful possession of a firearm. If found guilty, Seow would be sentenced to mandatory life imprisonment. However, on 20 May 2018, according to the police as reported by a Chinese newspaper, Seow, who confessed to his crime during police investigations, died from an illness while in remand before he could be tried for his arms charge.
2 November 1980: At a fishing port located in Jurong, 16-year-old fishery employee Teo Keng Siang and 31-year-old fish dealer Lee Cheng Tiong, were killed inside Lee's office by an unknown group of assailants. Two years later, a 22-year-old Malaysian named Beh Meng Chai was arrested shortly after he arrived at Singapore after a breakthrough in police investigations. Beh confessed that he and two others were involved in robbing and killing the victims and gave away the names of his accomplices, who all ran off to Malaysia after the killings. One of them, 21-year-old Sim Min Teck, was arrested in Kuantan, Malaysia in July 1983 and sent back to Singapore to be charged with murder. Beh, who fully cooperated with the police and expressed his willingness to testify against Sim, had his charges reduced to culpable homicide and he was sentenced to life imprisonment and 24 strokes of the cane on 8 October 1984. Sim, on the other hand, was found guilty of the two original charges of murder and thus sentenced to death on 27 March 1985. Sim lost his appeal on 7 July 1986, and he was eventually hanged. As of today, the third and final suspect Chng Meng Joo remained on the run for killing the two victims.
 19 November 1980: At a kampung in Jalan Petua, Jurong Road (now known as Bukit Batok), eight-year-old schoolgirl Goh Beng Choo was found dead behind the kampung's Taoist temple. Goh's then-ten-year-old brother Leng Hai last saw her on the road in front their house as he went to buy noodles for his family, and she went missing for a few hours before her body was found on that same night. The cause of death was a ruptured liver, resulting from blows to the abdomen. Goh was also sexually assaulted prior to her death. The Goh family put up a reward of S$10,000 for information leading up to the arrest and conviction of Beng Choo's murderer. 41 years later, Goh's brother and elderly parents (still alive in their eighties) once again made an public appeal for information to help solve the case. As of 2022, the murderer(s) of Goh Beng Choo remains undiscovered.

1981
 25 January and 7 February 1981: In a case known as the Toa Payoh ritual murders, 39-year-old Adrian Lim, a self-professed medium, and his two accomplices – 26-year-old Catherine Tan Mui Choo and 25-year-old Hoe Kah Hong – kidnapped, tortured and killed two children – nine-year-old Agnes Ng Siew Heok and ten-year-old Ghazali bin Marzuki – purportedly as blood sacrifices in a ritual in Lim's flat in Toa Payoh. On 25 May 1983, all three of them were found guilty of murder and sentenced to death by High Court judges T. S. Sinnathuray and F. A. Chua. They were hanged on 25 November 1988.
 20 September 1981: 22-year-old Ramu Annadavascan and 16-year-old Rathakrishnan Ramasamy took turns to assault 45-year-old Kalingam Mariappan with a rake at East Coast Parkway after an argument between Ramu and Kalingam. Due to the injuries, Kalingam lost consciousness and collapsed. Ramu and Rathakrishnan then set him on fire, causing him to be burned to death. Both of them were later arrested and found guilty of murder in July 1984. Ramu was sentenced to death and hanged on 19 September 1986, while Rathakrishnan, who was under the age of 18 when he committed the murder, was indefinitely detained under the President's Pleasure. After serving nearly 20 years in prison, Rathakrishnan was released in September 2001.
6 November 1981: 31-year-old Goh Siew Foon was shot from behind by 31-year-old Chin Sheong Hon, who used a revolver to injure Goh and stole her suitcase containing $92,000 of cash and cheques. Goh was seriously wounded and was hospitalized for 45 days and she survived. Chin, who also attacked and robbed Ee Chong Leong and Chua Boon Leong in July and October 1981 respectively, fled Singapore soon after, and he spent 32 years hiding in Thailand. Chin was finally arrested in 2013 and repatriated to Singapore after completing his jail term in Bangkok for joining an illegal "red shirt" protest, but in 2015, Chin was assesed mentally unfit to stand trial, leading to suspension of court proceedings and Chin's indefinite detention at the Institute of Mental Health (IMH) from 2015 to 2021. On 15 November 2022, 72-year-old Chin Sheong Hon pleaded guilty to robbing and harming Goh with a firearm, as well as the two other robberies of Ee and Chua. After receiving the defendant's guilty plea, Justice Pang Khang Chau rejected the prosecution's request for life imprisonment (which would mean a term of 20 years due to the offences having took place 16 years before the 1997 Abdul Nasir appeal) and instead sentenced Chin to 18 years' imprisonment. Goh, who was interviewed in 2015, revealed that even after many years, she was still traumatized but when asked about Chin's capture, Goh stated she found closure by thinking "heaven is fair and that people who commit crimes will receive their punishment."

1982
 6 October 1982: Ng Beng Kee and his accomplice Tan Hock Bin were arrested with 27.3kg of heroin in the car park of the Apollo Hotel in Havelock Road. It was believed the drugs were smuggled into Singapore by speedboat and were due to be brought to Hong Kong via ship, and Singapore was not the final destination. Central Narcotics Bureau agents had been investigating the syndicate for over six months before they moved in to make an arrest.During their trial in 1985, Deputy Public Prosecutor Michael Khoo stated Ng and Tan were arrested after moving 20.4kg of pure heroin, with an estimated street value of over $32 million, from Bukit Panjang village to the car park of the Apollo Hotel in Havelock Road. This was by far the largest amount of heroin ever seized by Singaporean authorities up until that date in time. Taking the stand in his own defence, Ng admitted he was a member of an international drugs syndicate and that the heroin seized on the day in question belonged to him.Ng also claimed he was due to receive a commission of HK$8 million if he succeeded in smuggling the approximately 27kgs of heroin to Hong Kong.Ng and Tan were both found guilty as charged and sentenced to death, and were hanged on 26 May 1989.

1983
28 March 1983: At a flat in Ang Mo Kio, two drug addicts - 30-year-old Michael Tan Teow and 26-year-old Lim Beng Hai - armed themselves with knives and attacked Tan's 28-year-old landlady, a housewife named Soh Lee Lee, and killed her. The men also stabbed Soh's two children three-year-old Jeremy Yeong Yin Kit and two-year-old Joyce Yeong Pei Ling to death. Both men, who also stole some items from the flat, were arrested within a month, and charged with murder. The men were sentenced to hang on 10 April 1985 and lost their appeals, but Tan committed suicide by drug overdose in May 1990, leaving only Lim to remain on death row for five more months before he was hanged on 5 October 1990 for the three murders.
 30 June and 23 July 1983: In a case known as the Andrew Road triple murders, 19-year-old Sek Kim Wah broke into the home of 61-year-old Robert Tay Bak Hong at Andrew Road on 23 July with the aid of a Malaysian national, 19-year-old Nyu Kok Meng. They were armed with a M16S1 assault rifle which Sek had stolen from Nee Soon Camp. All five victims – Tay, 45-year-old Annie Tay (Tay's wife), 12-year-old Dawn Tay (the Tays' daughter), 27-year-old Jovita S. Virador (the Tays' Filipino domestic helper), and Tang So Ha (Dawn's private tutor) – were confined in a bedroom. Sek and Nyu robbed the Tay family of their jewellery and made them cash out money from their bank accounts. Sek murdered the Tay couple and Virador one-by-one while Nyu was guarding the others in another room. When Nyu found out about the murders, he took the rifle with him into a bedroom and locked the door. Sek tried to get Nyu to open the door but Nyu refused, so Sek fled. Nyu then released Dawn Tay and Tang before fleeing to Malaysia. On 29 July 1983, Sek was arrested at his sister's home, where he attempted suicide while the police were closing in on him. Prior to the Andrew Road murders, Sek had strangled two other victims – 42-year-old Lim Khee Sin and 32-year-old Ong Ah Hong – at Marine Parade in June 1983 and disposed of their bodies near Seletar Reservoir. During the trial, Sek said that he was inspired by the outlaw Lim Ban Lim and had always wanted to die on the gallows. On 14 August 1985, High Court judges Lai Kew Chai and Abdul Wahab Ghows found Sek guilty of murder and sentenced him to death; Sek was eventually hanged on 9 December 1988. Nyu, who surrendered to the Royal Malaysia Police, was extradited to Singapore to stand trial. He was acquitted of murder but charged with armed robbery and sentenced to life imprisonment and six strokes of the cane.
 31 October 1983: 23-year-old Teo Boon Ann brutally murdered 66-year-old Chong Kin Meng in her home while planning to commit robbery. Tracing the fingerprints from a wedding card found at the crime scene, the police tracked down and arrested Teo, who was charged with murder. During his trial, Teo claimed that he had tried to rob Chong, but she had turned aggressive and attacked him, so he had acted in self-defence and unintentionally caused her to die. However, the evidence showed that Teo had tried to convince his girlfriend to assist him in the robbery and he had told her to murder Chong if their plot was discovered, and from the pathologist Chao Tzee Cheng's autopsy results, the severe injuries found on the victim and lack of defensive wounds on Teo showed that there was no way Chong could be the aggressor and her injuries were not inflicted by Teo in self-defence. Teo was thus found guilty of murder by the two trial judges - Justice Punch Coomaraswamy and Judicial Commissioner Chan Sek Keong - and he was sentenced to death on 3 February 1987. Teo lost his appeal on 15 August 1988 and was eventually hanged on 20 April 1990.

1984
 30 July 1984: 31-year-old Khor Kok Soon and his accomplice, Toh Huay Seow, were looking for victims to rob in Shenton Way when they were ambushed by police. Toh was arrested while Khor managed to escape. During the escape, Khor fired three shots at 43-year-old police sergeant Lim Kiah Chin, who managed to dodge the gunshots, before getting onto a lorry. Khor then forced the lorry driver, 25-year-old Ong King Hock, to drive him away before killing him and abandoning the lorry in an alley. He escaped to Malaysia and was arrested on 27 December 2003 in Johor before he was extradited to Singapore to face charges. During the trial, Khor denied killing Ong and maintained that he never intended to harm anyone even though he used a firearm. On 25 February 2005, High Court judge Kan Ting Chiu gave Khor a discharge not amounting to an acquittal for Ong's murder, but sentenced him to death for unlawfully discharging a firearm thrice. Khor appealed to the Court of Appeal but his appeal was dismissed on 26 September 2005 and he was eventually hanged.
 4 September 1984: 27-year-old Neo Man Lee murdered 30-year-old Lim Chiew Kim (Judy Quek) in the women's bathroom outside the swimming pool of the condominium she was living in. He was arrested three weeks later and charged with murder. However, after he was found to be suffering from schizophrenia and that he had a relapse on the night he killed Lim, the original charge of murder was reduced to one of culpable homicide not amounting to murder. On 25 May 1989, Neo was found guilty of culpable homicide not amounting to murder and sentenced to life imprisonment.
 24 October 1984: 39-year-old American Express banker  Frankie Tan Tik Siah was found murdered by strangulation. His wife, 50-year-old Lee Chee Poh, confessed that she had plotted with Tan's adoptive brother, 41-year-old Vasavan Sathiadew, and three Thai nationals – 42-year-old Phan Khenapin (also spelt Phan Khenapim), 21-year-old Wan Pathong (also spelt Wan Phatong), and a third accomplice known as "Ah-Poo" (real name Buakkan Vajjarin) – to murder Tan. The police managed to arrest Lee, Sathiadew, Phan and Wan but Ah-Poo, who escaped Singapore to Thailand after committing the crime, was not caught. Meanwhile, the four conspirators of Tan's murder were all charged with murder. During Lee's trial in 1988, it was revealed that Tan had affairs with other women, including Sathiadew's wife. Lee's charge of murder was reduced to abetment of culpable homicide not amounting to murder, and she was sentenced to seven years' imprisonment on 17 October 1988, with her jail term backdated to the date of her arrest. Sathiadew, Phan and Wan, who all stood trial in a separate court in July 1989, claimed that they only wanted to beat up Tan, and that it was "Ah-Poo" who strangled Tan. Sathiadew's defence of diminished responsibility was corroborated by his daughter's testimony. High Court judges Joseph Grimberg and T. S. Sinnathuray rejected the three men's defences based on the evidence, found them guilty of murder on 6 October 1989, and sentenced them to death. They were hanged on 23 October 1992. Lee was subsequently released from prison on parole in June 1989 after serving her jail term with good behaviour. , "Ah-Poo" is still at large.
 2 November 1984: In front of a witness, 28-year-old Hensley Anthony Neville killed 19-year-old Lim Hwee Huang by throwing her off to her death, and evidence showed that he had allegedly raped Lim before killing her. After being on the run for more than two years, Neville was arrested in Malaysia in 1987; he was also suspected of killing two more people in 1986 while hiding at the Malaysian state of Selangor. He was extradited from Kuala Lumpur to Singapore on 18 March 1987, and later found guilty of murder on 22 November 1990, and sentenced to death. He lost his appeal on 12 November 1991. According to a 1992 Crimewatch episode, it was revealed that Neville was hanged on 28 August 1992, nine months after his appeal was dismissed.
 9 November 1984: At the Sea View Hotel in Amber Road, 26-year-old Gan Thian Chai was attacked and allegedly killed before being thrown to his death from the balcony. There were evidence of gambling found in Gan's hotel room, implying that the murder was due to possible money disputes. Two years later, one 43-year-old Singaporean suspect by the name of Tham Kwok Wah (alias Tham Kok Wah; born 7 October 1943) was placed on the police's wanted list for his suspected involvement in Gan's alleged murder. However, Tham had changed his name to Tham Kwok Theng and fled Singapore to Australia since 1986 by the time the police established his identity. Tham hid in Australia, where he faked his Australian citizenship, for 32 years before he was finally caught in 2018, with his false identity exposed and him being charged in the courts of Australia for identity fraud and falsely claimed pension benefits, which alerted the Singapore authorities to Tham's presence. Tham is currently serving six years and nine months in jail since January 2020 for his identity fraud offences, and the Singapore authorities requested his extradition, but Australia has a law which decreed that anyone facing the death penalty in whichever foreign countries will not face extradition, unless there is assurance that the person would not receive it or be executed. Since January 2021, the Singapore authorities are currently working with the Australian police to facilitate investigations in the unsolved murder of Gan Thian Chai, as well as to discuss about Tham Kwok Wah's possible extradition.
 12 December 1984: In a case known as the "curry murder", 34-year-old Ayakanno Marithamuthu, a caretaker at the PUB-run holiday chalets in Changi, was reported missing. He was allegedly bludgeoned to death in the Orchard Road Presbyterian Church near his residence, dismembered and cooked in curry. His remains were suspected to have been packed in plastic bags and disposed in rubbish bins around Singapore. Over a two-year-long investigation, neither the remains nor any evidence of the alleged murder were found. On 23 March 1987, a total of six suspects were arrested and charged with murder: 33-year-old Nagaratha Vally Ramiah (Marithamuthu's wife); Kamachi Krishnasamy (Marithamuthu's mother-in-law); and Ramiah's three brothers and one of Ramiah's sisters-in-law. On 6 June 1987, the six were brought to court but due to insufficient evidence, district judge Zainol Abeedin bin Hussin granted them a discharge not amounting to an acquittal. Ramiah's three brothers were detained at Changi Prison from 22 June 1987 until their unconditional release on 21 June 1991. , the case remains unsolved.

1985
 26 April 1985: Sim Ah Cheoh was arrested together with her two accomplices, 30-year-old Ronald Tan Chong Ngee and 31-year-old Lim Joo Yin, for transporting 1.37 kg of heroin in a taxi from Hotel Negara in Claymore Drive to Changi Airport. All were charged with drug trafficking. Sim, a single mother with two sons, was said to have led a difficult life of poverty and tragedy, including being orphaned at the age of three after her mother's death. She had accepted the job out of desperation for money to pay her debts. On 30 July 1988, all three were convicted of drug trafficking and sentenced to death; Lim and Tan were hanged on 3 April 1992. On 25 March 1992, Sim was granted clemency by President Wee Kim Wee and had her death sentence commuted to life imprisonment. In November 1993, Sim fell sick while serving her sentence and was diagnosed with cervical cancer. In 1995, after she was told that she had at most one year left to live, she appealed to President Ong Teng Cheong to be released so that she could spend the final moments of her life with her sons and relatives. The President granted her request and she was released from prison on 16 February 1995. She died on 30 March 1995 at the age of 47.
 22 May 1985: Winnifred Teo Suan Lie, an 18-year-old Catholic Junior College student, was the victim of a rape-and-murder case. She had left her house for a jog on 22 May 1985 but never returned home. After her mother made a police report, Teo's naked body was later found lying in undergrowth off Old Holland Road. She had suffered multiple stab wounds on her neck and her body showed signs of a fierce but futile struggle. An autopsy showed that she had been sexually assaulted and had died of bleeding from the stab wounds. , the case remains unsolved.
 November 1985: The Corrupt Practices Investigation Bureau (CPIB) received a report from Liaw Teck Kee, a former employee of National Development Minister Teh Cheang Wan, revealing that he had bribed Teh on two occasions by paying him a total of S$800,000 in 1981 and 1982 for him to prevent the government from acquiring part of a company's land. Teh denied the accusations and even convinced the CPIB director to drop the case. After hearing about the case, Prime Minister Lee Kuan Yew ordered a secret investigation into the double allegations of bribery. After sufficient evidence was gathered, Lee approved the request for an open investigation on 28 November 1986. The CPIB went with Liaw to the Istana to interrogate Teh over the allegations after they were convinced that Liaw was a truthful witness. Lee also demanded Teh to take a leave of absence until 31 December 1986. On 14 December 1986, a 58-year-old Teh was found dead at home with a signed handwritten letter addressed to Lee, in which he wrote that he felt depressed by the investigation and allegations, adding that it would be appropriate for him to "pay the highest penalty" for his mistake. An autopsy certified that the cause of Teh's death was suicide from an overdose of sleeping pills. Since Teh was dead, the Attorney-General's Chambers could not proceed with the charges of corruption against Teh. The investigation was revealed only in January 1987 when Lee addressed Parliament on Teh's death and his suicide note. The incident was mentioned again by Lee in a speech to Parliament as Minister Mentor in 2004, in which he reiterated it as an example to emphasise Singapore's zero tolerance towards corruption. Despite the allegations, Lee acknowledged Teh's contributions to the Housing and Development Board and as National Development Minister during his political career from 1979 to 1986.
 18 December 1985: Lim Keng Peng had committed theft and fled from the crime scene. When he was spotted by Detective Goh Ah Khia who had earlier attended to the crime scene, Lim fired a fatal shot at Goh's chest and fled. Goh's death sparked a manhunt for Lim, who was also found to be responsible for the shooting of a restaurant owner in a robbery attempt in April 1985. On 3 May 1988, Lim was confronted by three policemen at a coffee shop at Sunset Way. When they attempted to arrest him, he pulled out his gun but they fired at him and killed him on the spot.

1986
 14 May 1986: Toh Hong Huat and Keh Chin Ann, two Primary Six students from the now-demolished Owen Primary School, were last seen together walking to school at around 12:30 pm. The two boys never showed up in class and had been missing since then. According to their families and teachers, the boys were generally well-behaved and had never missed classes before. Their families called the police and a search for the missing boys, extending to Malaysia and Thailand, was carried out. The two boys' families also offered rewards for any information on the boys' whereabouts. This case was dubbed the "McDonald's boys case" as the fast food chain McDonald's offered a reward of S$100,000 for any information of the boys' whereabouts.

1987
9 February 1987 – 18 January 2000: Over a period of 13 years, Singapore Airlines cabin crew supervisor Teo Cheng Kiat misappropriated an approximate sum of S$35 million from his company. Teo joined Singapore Airlines as a clerk in May 1975 and was promoted to cabin crew supervisor in 1988. It was his job at that time to oversee the allowance payments to the cabin crew. Teo siphoned money off the payments and transferred them to his bank accounts while doctoring records of the cabin members on the flights, using names of those who did not fly on the various flights to conceal his criminal activities. He also manipulated his wife and younger sister to allow him to gain control of their bank accounts and transfer the money he embezzled to their bank accounts. It was due to an internal audit error that led to the arrest of a 47-year-old Teo on 19 January 2000. On 30 June 2000, High Court judge Tay Yong Kwang found Teo guilty of ten charges of criminal breach of trust and sentenced him to 24 years in prison.

1988
16 February 1988: Upon hearing that his foster father, Tan Ai Soon, had been severely assaulted, 22-year-old Koh Swee Beng gathered five people – Tan's three sons Tan Eng Chye, Tan Eng Poh and Tan Eng Geok; the Tan brothers' brother-in-law Ng Eng Guan; and their friend Ong Hong Thor – to confront 31-year-old Tay Kim Teck, the man who assaulted the elder Tan. When they were beating up Tay, Koh used a knife to stab Tay five times. Two of those wounds were fatal, leading to Tay's death within minutes. All six of them were later arrested and charged with murder. However, only Koh was found guilty of murder and sentenced to death on 20 April 1990, while the other five had their charges reduced to rioting and they were each sentenced to two years' jail and four strokes of the cane. Although he lost his appeal in September 1991, Koh was eventually granted clemency by President Wee Kim Wee on 13 May 1992 and had his death sentence commuted to life imprisonment. During his imprisonment, Koh turned to Buddhism and completed his GCE O-levels. He also went on to study a two-year electronics course at ITE while serving his life sentence at Kaki Bukit Centre (now a defunct prison). Koh was released from prison in September 2005 for good behaviour after serving at least two-thirds of his life sentence.

1989
 28 January 1989: A 26-year-old man named Lim Lee Tin was found dead at a Chinese cemetery. When forensic pathologist Wee Keng Poh conducted an autopsy on Lim, he found that Lim was not a man, but rather a woman who often dressed in men's clothes. Six days later, Lim's girlfriend, a 29-year-old Malaysian and married housewife named Chin Seow Noi was arrested as a suspect, and Chin's 27-year-old younger brother Chin Yau Kim was also arrested at Johor before being extradited to Singapore. It was revealed that Chin Seow Noi, who was repeatedly harassed by Lim due to her wanting money, asked her brother and a third accomplice - a 25-year-old Malaysian bus ticket seller Ng Kim Heng (a friend of the Chin siblings) - to murder Lim due to her unable to take the harassment any longer. Ng was arrested two years later on 20 July 1991 in Malaysia, and extradited back to Singapore to stand trial together with the Chin siblings for Lim's murder. The three conspirators elected to remain silent in the trial and tried to raise doubts over their confessions despite admitting to the crime. On 9 October 1992, Judicial Commissioner Amarjeet Singh found the trio guilty of murder and sentenced them to death. After the loss of their appeals, Chin Seow Noi, Chin Yau Kim and Ng Kim Heng were eventually hanged on 31 March 1995.
 15 February 1989: 29-year-old Ong Yeow Tian and 26-year-old Chua Gin Boon were attempting to break into a shop unit at Tampines Street 11 in the early hours of the morning when they were spotted by two policemen following a tip-off by a member of the public. Ong ran away while one of the policemen arrested Chua. The other policeman, 22-year-old Police Constable Mirza Abdul Halim bin Mirza Abdul Majid, chased Ong. When Ong attacked Mirza, the latter took out his revolver in an attempt to defend himself but the former overpowered him and shot him in the head before fleeing with the revolver. Ong tried to escape in a taxi until he was sighted by two other policemen. The taxi pulled over and Ong used the stolen revolver to fire at them. In return, they shot Ong in the abdomen but Ong managed to flee. The Police Task Force was activated to hunt for Ong. During the ensuing firefight, Ong managed to shoot one policeman, who was saved by the bulletproof vest he wore. Ong was eventually subdued and arrested. Mirza went into a coma and was given a rare field promotion to the rank of Corporal before he died the next day. Chua was sentenced to two years and three months' jail and six strokes of the cane on 4 March 1989 for robbery and lower firearm charges, while Ong was found guilty of unlawfully discharging a firearm and sentenced to death in October 1992. Ong appealed against his sentence but lost the appeal and was hanged on 25 November 1994. This incident resulted in the introduction of snatch-resistant holsters for police officers in later years.
11 April 1989: 56-year-old Phang Tee Wah, a goldsmith, was kidnapped and the two people who abducted him demanded a ransom of $1 million from Phang's family. However, four days after his disappearance, Phang was found murdered in a deserted area at Pasir Ris. That same day, the kidnappers - Liow Han Heng (alias William Liow) and Ibrahim Masod - were arrested for allegedly holding Phang hostage at Liow's Yishun flat before killing him, as well as stealing Phang's watch to sell for money. On 23 July 1992, both Liow and Ibrahim were found guilty of murder by Justice T S Sinnathuray, and consequently sentenced to death. However, 48-year-old Liow died from a heart attack while on death row on 10 August 1993, leaving only Ibrahim to appeal against his sentence, but the three judges of Appeal Chao Hick Tin, Goh Joon Seng and M Karthigesu of the Court of Appeal rejected his appeal on 11 November 1993, and Ibrahim was later executed at age 55 on 29 July 1994.
2 October 1989: Liang Shan Shan (梁姗姗), a 17-year-old student from Mayflower Secondary School, was reported missing by her parents. She was last seen boarding her school bus at 1 pm. 12 days later, her highly decomposed body was discovered by National Servicemen training at Yishun Industrial Park. Although her cause of death could not be determined, police investigations narrowed down to one suspect: 35-year-old Oh Laye Koh (胡立国), the school bus driver. Oh was then charged with Liang's murder based on only circumstantial evidence, and Oh was also suspected of murdering 18-year-old lounge waitress Norhayah binti Mohamed Ali in 1982, which led to him facing a second murder charge a month after his arrest for killing Liang. Oh was initially acquitted of murdering Liang at the end of his trial in 1992. However, the prosecution appealed against the acquittal and it was accepted, and the re-trial started on 27 April 1994. Oh chose to remain silent when he had to make his defence. On 3 May 1994, High Court judge Amarjeet Singh concluded from Oh's decision to remain silent and his failure to provide evidence "arose from a consciousness of guilt in the face of the circumstantial evidence". He found Oh guilty of murder and sentenced him to death. Oh's appeal to the Court of Appeal was dismissed on 29 July 1994, and his clemency petition was also rejected on 5 April 1995. A month after losing his final bid to escape the gallows, 39-year-old Oh Laye Koh was hanged on 19 May 1995. 
 19 December 1989: At a coffee shop in Ang Mo Kio, 72-year-old coffee shop owner Ling Ha Hiang was attacked by a group of three robbers who used raffia string, metal wires and masking tape to bind the elderly man's hands and legs, as well as wrapping the tape around his nose and mouth. This led to Ling to suffocate to death. The trio stole around S$4,100 in cash before they left. It took two years for police investigations to finally identify the robbers and arrest one of them: 35-year-old Wong Onn Cheong, who was charged with murder in 1991 and robbery but subsequently sentenced to ten years' imprisonment and 18 strokes of the cane in January 1993. Another offender, Sim Thiam Seng, who migrated to Canada six months after the crime, was arrested at Changi Airport in 1991 when he returned to Singapore, and he was convicted of robbery and received a jail term of eight years with 12 strokes of the cane. The third and final suspect, 25-year-old Ong Seng Chuen, meanwhile, remained in Singapore under a low profile while hiding from the authorities. Slowly, during the next 21 years while leading a tough life on the run, Ong increasingly felt remorse for his crime, and in October 2010, he finally surrendered to the police and faced charges of culpable homicide and robbery. Ong's family, including his long-time girlfriend and son (whom he fathered in 2000 while on the run), pleaded for leniency on account that Ong did not commit any offences while on the run and acted as a loving and caring husband and father to his girlfriend and son. On account that Ong did surrender himself out of guilt and has kept a clean record while on the run, the High Court sentenced 48-year-old Ong to six years' imprisonment and 12 strokes of the cane.

1990s

1990
 24 March 1990: At two different locations, two women were found murdered on that same night. One of them, 18-year-old Ng Lee Kheng, died from a fall from a flat at Circuit Road, while the other, Ng's 19-year-old best friend Foo Chin Chin, was stabbed fourteen times at an area near East Coast Park. The killings, which stirred the nation at that time, were all committed by 19-year-old carpenter Ng Soo Hin, who was Foo's boyfriend. Ng Soo Hin was charged with the two murders, and later stood trial solely for killing his girlfriend (who tried to break up with him before her death) while the other charge for killing Ng Lee Kheng was stood down temporarily. Despite confessing to the two murders, Ng Soo Hin stated he suffered from diminished responsibility at the time of the offences, but his defence was rejected and he was sentenced to death on 27 May 1993 for Foo's murder.
 15 May 1990: 21-year-old Kelly Tan Ah Hong and her boyfriend, 22-year-old James Soh Fook Leong, were attacked by two men while they were on a date at Amber Beacon Tower in East Coast Park. Tan was stabbed in the neck while Soh was knifed in the back. Soh managed to reach a nearby restaurant to seek help before losing consciousness. Both of them were hospitalised. Soh survived the attack, but Tan died from her neck wound. Soh was unable to identify the attackers and had no idea why he and Tan were attacked. There were also no murder weapons found at the scene. A 2015 report revealed that Soh is married and has a son. He is still haunted by the memory of that incident. , the case remains unsolved.
 10 October 1990: 38-year-old Clementina Curci Di Girolamo, who had just migrated from Italy to Singapore with her family three days before her death, was found dead in a bathroom at her new house around Bo Seng Avenue. She had died due to being immersed in water and strangulation. 18-year-old Maksa bin Tohaiee, a cleaner working for the family, had been stealing items from the house when Curci had caught and confronted him. They got into a fight which led to Curci losing consciousness after Maksa strangled her. Maksa claimed that he thought that she was dead so he left her body in the bathtub and fled. Maksa was arrested and charged with murder. Although he had confessed earlier, during the trial Maksa denied signing the confession and tried to establish an alibi that he was not at the murder scene on the day. However, the testimonies given by Maksa's family members about where Maksa's whereabouts at the time of the murder were riddled with inconsistencies, resulting in Maksa failing to substantiate his alibi defence. On 25 November 1992, Maksa was found guilty of murder and sentenced to death. He filed an appeal to the Court of Appeal and made a plea for presidential clemency, but both pleas were rejected and he was eventually hanged a year later on 26 November 1993.
12 October 1990: 30-year-old Tan Hui Ngin was last seen leaving her home to go babysit her brother-in-law's children but she never came back. Tan was reported missing for four days before her half-naked corpse was discovered at an abandoned egg hatchery in Punggol. Five months later, a suspect was arrested in Malaysia and extradited to Singapore to face a murder charge. The killer, who was Tan's childhood friend Lim Lye Hock, a Singaporean, was found guilty of murder by Justice Lai Kew Chai and sentenced to death on 1 December 1993.
 27 October 1990: 30-year-old transvestite Lim Yeow Chuan was found dead in Johore Road, Bugis Street. His body was riddled with stab wounds. According to witnesses, Lim was last seen with two men, 23-year-old Malaysian national Soosay a/l Sinnappen and 21-year-old Kuppiah Saravanan, who were arrested and charged with Lim's murder. However, Soosay, who stabbed Lim, would eventually stand trial alone for murder, while Kuppiah was sentenced to five years' jail and 12 strokes of the cane for robbery and assault. At the trial in 1992, Soosay told the court that they had a friend, Leo Chin Hwang, who had met Lim two days before the murder, and revealed that Lim had stolen Leo's gold chain and money; Leo had sought Soosay and Kuppiah's help to get the gold chain back from Lim. However, when they confronted Lim, he not only refused to return the gold chain, but also turned aggressive and threatened the men with a knife, going as far as to insult Soosay's mother. Soosay then fought with Lim. When Lim refused to stop fighting, Soosay stabbed him a few times. Lim had pursued the two men for a few yards before he collapsed and died. Soosay's account was corroborated by Kuppiah's testimony at the trial. On 2 November 1992, Soosay was found guilty of murder and sentenced to death by High Court judge M. P. H. Rubin. However, upon appeal, the Court of Appeal found Soosay guilty of culpable homicide not amounting to murder on 10 August 1993, and sentenced him to nine years in jail.
 10 December 1990: Nigerian nationals Gabriel Okonkwo and Paul Okechukwu Ngwudo were arrested at the Harbour View Dai-Ichi hotel on Anson Road, after the Central Narcotics Bureau raided their room and discovered 784 grams of heroin in the secret compartment of a briefcase. Undercover DEA agent Wilbert Lee Plummer, who was also involved in the operation that resulted in the arrest of Johannes van Damme, had earlier collected another briefcase containing heroin from the pair, on the understanding that he was a drug mule who would take it back to America. Both were found guilty of drug trafficking, sentenced to death, and hanged on 5 August 1994.

1991
 23 April 1991: Ten-year-old schoolgirl Kuah Bee Hong was found murdered at her flat in Viking Road by her sister who just returned home from school. The killer was revealed to be Goh Hong Choon, the 25-year-old neighbour and friend of the Kuah family. Goh entered the house that day to commit robbery, and for fear of leaving behind witnesses, Goh killed Kuah by strangulation and even slit her wrists to make sure she was dead. Goh was found guilty after a 2-day murder trial and sentenced to death on 22 April 1993. Goh was executed on 29 July 1994.
 4 May 1991: 39-year-old Filipino domestic worker Flor Contemplacion murdered another Filipino domestic worker, 34-year-old Della Maga, and Nicholas Huang, the four-year-old son of Maga's employer. She was sentenced to death in January 1993 and hanged on 17 March 1995. The incident caused diplomatic relations between Singapore and the Philippines to be strained for some years.
 27 September 1991: 56-year-old Dutch national Johannes van Damme was arrested at Changi Airport after the police found 4.3 kg of heroin in his suitcase. He was found guilty of drug trafficking, sentenced to death, and hanged on 23 September 1994.

1992
 19 November 1992: After a failed hold-up at Tin Seng Goldsmith, 25-year-old Ng Theng Shuang and 27-year-old Lee Kok Chin, both Malaysians armed with guns and grenades, engaged in a shootout with 22-year-old Cisco officer Karamjit Singh and Singh was injured on the thigh as a result of Ng shooting him but he survived. Two other people - 57-year-old salesman Ou Kai San and Rosie Kee Lye Choon were also shot by Ng but they survived as well. During the robbers' escape, Lee was shot in the chest by Singh and he died while getting away on a motorcycle. Ng alone escaped from Singapore to Penang, where he was caught on 29 December 1993. On 15 September 1994, Ng was found guilty of illegally discharging a firearm under the amended Arms Offences Act, which mandated the death penalty for the crime Ng was convicted of. Ng lost his appeal against the death sentence and he was hanged on 14 July 1995. As for Ng's accomplice Lee Kok Chin, he was suspected of killing another moneychanger during an unrelated robbery and a coroner's court found Lee guilty of the murder on 1 December 1997. In the aftermath, Officer Singh, who recovered and returned to his job after a six-month medical leave, received a plate from Certis Cisco and a certificate of commendation from the police, and Singh, who was since married with two daughters, commented in a 2014 article that he never forgotten about the incident despite leaving the past behind him.
29 November 1992: 26-year-old Maniam Rathinswamy and his accomplice, 31-year-old S.S. Asokan, used an axe to murder 32-year-old illegal moneylender Tan Heng Hong. After killing Tan, the duo drove his car to Mandai, where they set fire to the car with his body inside. Forensic pathologist Chao Tzee Cheng managed to ascertain Tan's identity and identify that the cause of death was a cut artery on the neck. Maniam, who was arrested and charged in January 1993, was sentenced to death for murder on 3 December 1993. Asokan, who had fled to Malaysia before he was arrested and extradited to Singapore to stand trial, was charged with murder and found guilty on 19 January 1995, and received the death penalty as well. Both Asokan and Maniam were hanged on 9 September 1995. The case was re-enacted in Whispers of the Dead, a Singaporean crime show which features notable cases solved by Chao Tzee Cheng.
 November 1992 and September 1993: A gang of five Thai workers - Prawit Yaowbutr, Manit Wangjaisuk, Panya Marmontree, Prasong Bunsom and Panya Amphawa - were involved in a series of worksite robberies, which resulted into the deaths of three foreign workers: a Burmese worker in November 1992 and two Indian workers in September 1993. All five were arrested and charged with gang robbery with murder. All five were later found guilty of murder and were eventually hanged on 15 March 1996.
 24 December 1992: On Christmas Eve, 22-year-old Junalis Lumut and 21-year-old Mohammad Ashiek Salleh robbed and killed taxi driver Teo Kim Hock and called his family for ransom. The duo were subsequently arrested for Teo's murder and were found guilty of murder and on 13 November 1994, the duo were sentenced to death and later hanged on 16 June 1995 after losing their appeals. On 17 April 1992, it was discovered that Junaidi also murdered another taxi driver, 57-year-old Seing Koo Wan in an unrelated case.

1993
 26 February 1993: Known as the Hougang double murders, 53-year-old Lau Gek Leng and his 55-year-old wife Luke Yip Khuan were both killed by their 38-year-old neighbour Jamaludin Ibrahim inside their matrimonial flat at Hougang. Jamaludin also stole a television set and VCR from the couple's flat. After the couple's son and second daughter found the bodies and called the police, Jamaludin was arrested hours later after his daughter told police that she witnessed her father stealing the missing items from the couple's flat. After failing to substantiate his defence of diminished responsibility, Jamaludin was sentenced to death for the two murders on 21 November 1994, and he was hanged on 28 July 1995 after losing his appeals.
14 July 1993: After his request to borrow money was rejected by a moneylender, 36-year-old Phua Soy Boon used a chopper to attack the 50-year-old moneylender Sim Ah Lek, who also worked as a contractor. Sim died due to two fatal wounds on his neck that caused him to suffer excessive blood loss. The body, which was stuffed inside a gunny sack, was discovered the next day at a carpark outside Jurong Swimming Complex. Phua was arrested a day after the body was discovered, and charged with murder. Phua was found guilty as charged and sentenced to death on 6 May 1994, and after losing his appeals, Phua was hanged on 16 June 1995.
 September 1993: 25-year-old Chong Poh Choon, a navy sergeant, murdered his three children at their flat in Bukit Batok. He was sentenced to life imprisonment in September 1994.
25 November 1993: 22-year-old Rozman Jusoh and his childhood friend Razali Mat Zin were both arrested for trafficking nearly 2kg of marijuana (or cannabis). Rozman and Razali, who were both Malaysians from Kelantan, were charged with two counts and brought to trial in October 1994. Rozman was found to have a sub-normal IQ of 74 and easily prone to manipulation, which may have played a part in Rozman selling drugs to undercover officers (who pretended to be marijuana buyers) after their persuasion. Razali, on the other hand, stated that he only rode the motorcycle that day to escort Rozman out of goodwill for his friend and fellow villager and did not know the presence of drugs on his motorcycle. Rozman was therefore sentenced on 7 March 1995 to seven years' imprisonment for two reduced charges of drug possession while Razali was cleared of all charges on the same day. However, the prosecution appealed against the trial verdict in August 1995, and it led to the Court of Appeal sentencing both Rozman and Razali to death for the original drug charges, on the grounds that both Razali and Rozman were active and willing participants in selling drugs despite the latter's low intellect and such mitigating factors cannot be used to discount the mandatory nature of the death penalty or the intention to commit the crime. Both men were hanged on 12 April 1996.
 14 December 1993: Three youths – Too Yin Sheong, Ng Chek Siong and Lee Chez Kee – attempted to rob 54-year-old university professor Lee Kok Cheong at his home and ended up killing him. The trio were only identified, arrested and put on trial five years after the murder. In 1998, a 26-year-old Too was convicted of murder and sentenced to death; he was hanged in 1999. In 2007, a 35-year-old Ng was sentenced to eight years' imprisonment and ten strokes of the cane for theft and cheating. Lee was sentenced to death in 2006 and the Court of Appeal dismissed his appeal in 2008 so he was eventually hanged at the age of 38.

1994
16 April 1994: When 80-year-old Loo Kwee Hwa was on the way to a friend's flat at Bedok North to play a card game, she was attacked inside a lift by a robber who not only robbed her of her gold chain and bangle, but also slit her throat using a paper cutter, causing Loo to die while staggering to a flight of stairs between the 15th and 16th floor. Two weeks later, a 22-year-old drug addict named Indra Wijaya Ibrahim was arrested for the killing, and he was charged with murder. After Indra stood trial in January 1995, he was sentenced to death a month later on 7 February 1995, and after losing his appeals, Indra was put to death at Changi Prison on 29 September 1995.

 6 June 1994: In a case known as the Oriental Hotel murder, 25-year-old Abdul Nasir bin Amer Hamsah and 32-year-old Abdul Rahman bin Arshad barged into a room shared by two Japanese tourists – 49-year-old Fujii Isae and 56-year-old Takishita Miyoko. Earlier that day, the two men were at the Oriental Hotel for a job interview when they spotted the Japanese tour group that Fujii and Takishita were with. They decided to rob the two women; Takishita was assaulted by Rahman and she pretended to faint to escape further injury. When Nasir attempted to escape after severely assaulting and robbing Fujii, he lost his balance and accidentally stepped on Fujii's face as he held onto the wall to try to steady himself, causing a facial fracture which obstructed her breathing and caused her death. Despite appeals for witnesses and a police sketch of the robbers being published on newspapers, the case went unsolved for 18 months. In January 1996, Nasir was arrested for attempting to rob and murder a taxi driver, and his fingerprints were found to match those found in Fujii and Takishita's room. Nasir confessed that he was involved in the robbery, while Rahman was later found to be in prison serving a 20-month jail sentence for theft. Both men were charged with murder; however, Rahman's charge was reduced to robbery with hurt, and he was sentenced to 10 years' jail and 16 strokes of the cane. At the end of Nasir's murder trial on 4 July 1996, High Court judge Choo Han Teck accepted Nasir's defence that he accidentally stepped on Fujii's face while rejecting the prosecution's argument that Nasir intentionally stamped on Fujii's face to kill her. For this, Nasir was acquitted of murder and he was sentenced to 18 years' jail and 18 strokes of the cane for robbery with hurt. The prosecution appealed against Nasir's acquittal. However, by a split decision of 2 to 1, the Court of Appeal dismissed the appeal. Nasir still had to go back to court to face a kidnapping charge, which he committed during the time of his remand. At the time of his remand, Nasir, together with drug trafficker Low Theng Gee, briefly kidnapped two police officers for ransom before being subdued by the police. Nasir was later found guilty of kidnapping and sentenced to life imprisonment and 12 strokes of the cane on 3 March 1997. However, the life sentence was ordered to run consecutively with the jail term he received for robbing Fujii, meaning that he would be serving a total of 38 years in prison. Nasir appealed for the two jail terms to run concurrently, but it was dismissed on 20 August 1997. However, in the course of the appeal, Chief Justice Yong Pung How also decided that life imprisonment should be considered as a term of incarceration for the remainder of a convicted prisoner's natural life instead of a jail term of 20 years. He also ruled that this amendment will apply to future cases after 20 August 1997. Nasir was not affected by this amendment, hence his life term remained a 20-year prison sentence, and he would be spending 38 years behind bars.
30 November 1994: 27-year-old Zainal Abidin Abdul Malik, who had a long criminal record for robbery and housebreaking offences, was returning from a foiled robbery attempt at a hotel near Newton Road when he encountered two police officers who were on their routine spot checks. When the officers approached him to discharge their usual duties, Zainal Abidin took out an axe and violently struck one of the officers - 47-year-old Senior Staff Sergeant Boo Tiang Huat - on the head, leading to SSSgt Boo dying instantly on the spot. Zainal Abidin was subsequently arrested after a manhunt and charged with murder. For intentionally using the axe to directly kill SSSgt Boo, Zainal Abidin was found guilty and sentenced to death on 15 July 1995, and after losing his appeals against the sentence, Zainal Abidin was hanged on 30 August 1996. In the aftermath, SSSgt Boo was posthumously promoted as Station Inspector (SI) for his long years of service in the Singapore Police Force. As of today, SI Boo Tiang Huat remains as the last policeman in Singapore to be murdered while in the line of duty.

1995
 26 February 1995: Britain's oldest merchant bank, Barings Bank, collapsed due to the trading activities of Nick Leeson, who lost S$1.4 billion by speculating on the Singapore International Monetary Exchange primarily using futures contracts. Leeson was arrested on 23 November 1995 after fleeing Singapore for 272 days. He pleaded guilty to two out of three charges of forgery and eight charges of cheating and was sentenced by district judge Tan Siong Thye to six years and six months in prison.
 8 March 1995: British national John Martin killed South African national Gerard George Lowe in River View Hotel, dismembered his body, and disposed the body parts in the Singapore River. He was arrested at Changi Airport on 19 March 1995 with some controlled items (e.g. an electroshock weapon) and 24 sticks of cannabis in his possession. On 7 November 1995, High Court judge T. S. Sinnathuray found Martin guilty of murder and sentenced him to death. Martin was eventually hanged on 19 April 1996 after withdrawing his appeal to the Court of Appeal and turning down his chance to appeal for presidential clemency.
 17 April 1995: 40-year-old Nadasan Chandra Secharan allegedly killed his 39-year-old girlfriend, Ramapiram Kannickaisparry. Ramipiram's face was brutally slashed and her body was rolled over several times by a vehicle before her body was abandoned in a forested area in Sembawang. Nadasan was arrested on 20 April 1995 and charged with murder. Some gold items and jewellery were found in Nadasan's van, and a tooth fragment was found at the underside of the van. After the tooth was confirmed to be Ramapiram's, the prosecution alleged that Nadasan had killed Ramipiram and ran her over with his van. A forensic expert confirmed that the tyre marks on Ramapiram's body belonged to Nadasan's van. However, the defence lawyer, Subhas Anandan, argued that Nadasan did not kill Ramipiram. The two forensic experts called by the defence claimed that the prosecution's expert witnesses were wrong to conclude the tyre marks were from Nadasan's van and that the tooth was Ramapiram's. Nadasan also denied killing Ramipiram, stating that he was on his way home on the day of the murder when his van broke down, and that he had taken over an hour to fix the van as it was raining. Nadasan also added he and Ramapiram had been intimate inside his van, and that Ramapiram had a habit of using her teeth to open beer bottles so her tooth could have broken off during one of such occasions. However, the prosecution produced an expert witness who claimed that it would only take 30 to 40 minutes to fix a van. Anandan countered that the witness did not understand the nature of the van, and that Nadasan himself was not a well-trained mechanic. At the end of the trial, High Court judge Lai Kew Chai found Nadasan guilty and sentenced him to death for murder in October 1996. After Nadasan filed an appeal, the Court of Appeal found the High Court's judgement weak and that the judge had erred in convicting Nadasan of murder despite all the evidence and arguments from both the prosecution and defence. Unanimously, in January 1997, the Court of Appeal allowed the appeal so Nadasan was acquitted of murder and released from prison. , the murder remains unsolved.
 May 1995: Outside her flat at Choa Chu Kang, 29-year-old Tan Hang Cheng, a mother of two daughters, was accused of murdering her daughters, one aged two months and the other three years, by throwing them outside the flat to their deaths. Tan was later convicted of culpable homicide not amounting to murder, as she was suffering from depression and insomnia at the time of the murders. It was revealed in court that Tan was overly stressed with her sole responsibility to take care of her father-in-law and her two daughters, the latter two whom happened to be suffering from health conditions at a young age. Her baby who was born in February 1995, suffered from jaundice while her elder child had asthma. Her father-in-law often woke up in the middle of the night screaming due to nightmares, which worsen her insomnia. High Court judge T S Sinnathuray sentenced Tan to a six-year term of imprisonment, after he personally addressed to her in his own words, "You will have to live with the memory of what you have done and that may be a punishment far more severe than any punishment the court can impose on you." and to send a message of deterrence and the courts to not condone the conduct of criminals who committed crimes due to sympathetic circumstances.
 24 June 1995: 7-year-old Lim Shiow Rong was found raped and murdered after she was last seen running off from her mother's coffee shop to see a friend of her father. The case remains unsolved as of 2022.
 30 October 1995: 27-year-old Lim Chwee Soon, a Malaysian, robbed a goldsmith shop known as Kee Hing Hung Rolex boutique at People's Park Complex. He also fired a gun seven times at the shop manager How Sau Chew, who was injured but later survived. Lim stole four Rolex watches worth $57,000 during the robbery before fleeing on a stolen motorcycle. He was arrested in November 1995 at Kuala Lumpur and extradited to Singapore for trial. Lim was found guilty under the Arms Offences Act for illegal discharge of firearms to cause hurt, and sentenced to death in July 1996. Lim was hanged on 26 July 1997 after losing his appeal.

1996
 26 May 1996: 23-year-old Asogan Ramesh Ramachandren, together with his two friends, 24-year-old Selvar Kumar Silvaras and 18-year-old Mathavakannan Kalimuthu, murdered 25-year-old Saravanan Michael Ramalingam, a gangster whom Asogan had previous conflicts with. On 27 November 1996, High Court judge Kan Ting Chiu found the trio guilty of murder and sentenced them to death. After losing their appeals on 14 October 1997, the trio petitioned to President Ong Teng Cheong for clemency on 13 January 1998. However, the President declined clemency to Asogan and Selvar so they were eventually hanged on 29 May 1998. On 28 April 1998, the President granted clemency to a 19-year-old Mathavakannan, who then had his death sentence commuted to life imprisonment. In 2012, a 33-year old Mathavakannan received an early release from prison for good behaviour after winning his appeal against the life sentence (as his life sentence was considered to be 20 years, since he committed the crime before 20 August 1997).
 26 August 1996: At a flat in Bedok Reservoir, Chua Hwa Soon Jimmy, a 25-year-old Singapore Army sergeant, had brutally murdered his 39-year-old sister-in-law, Neo Lam Lye, and even slashed his four-year-old nephew, Chua Kwee Hao Garret. Neo was found dead with 109 stab and slash wounds on her body, while Garret survived. Witnesses told police they saw Chua running out of the flat with his hands and army uniform stained with blood. Following the witnesses' descriptions, the police tracked down and arrested Chua, who confessed that he killed Neo, and revealed that when he was 15, he had an affair with Neo who started it. He stated that he wanted to let go of the past and did not want to restart the affair again as he was already married for two years and had a daughter. Chua was then charged with the murder of his sister-in-law and the attempted murder of his nephew. At the end of the trial on 14 April 1997, High Court judge T. S. Sinnathuray rejected Chua's defence of diminished responsibility and found him guilty of both charges, thereby sentencing him to death. Chua lost his appeal in February 1998 and was subsequently hanged.
 4 October 1996: 29-year-old Zulkarnain bin Kemat murdered his drinking and smoking partner, 51-year-old Jetkor Miang Singh, at her flat in Ang Mo Kio. Zulkarnain and Singh had been arguing before the former stabbed the latter in the neck with a pocket nail knife and kicked her repeatedly. To conceal his crime, Zulkarnain wiped the table containing his fingerprints. He also discarded the ashtray, but failed to discard the cigarette butts which contained his saliva. The case was initially unsolved as the police could not establish concrete evidence that Zulkarnian had murdered Singh and DNA profiling was not fully reliable. Over the years, as DNA profiling became more accurate and faster, collection of DNA samples from all convicts was made mandatory in 2002. The case was reopened in November 2003 and investigations revealed that the DNA sample found on the cigarette matched Zulkarnian's. In 2005, a 37-year-old Zulkarnian was charged with culpable homicide and sentenced by High Court judge Woo Bih Li to eight years' imprisonment and six strokes of the cane. His sentence ran concurrently with his sentence of six years and six months' imprisonment and three strokes of the cane for consuming drugs, which was imposed in September 2000. After his release, Zulkarnain was arrested again and sentenced to life imprisonment for drug trafficking on 20 November 2013.
 4 October 1996: 27-year-old Kwan Cin Cheng, a Malaysian working in Singapore, was accused of murdering his Malaysian girlfriend Phang Ai Looi, whom he met since 1988, at Yung Kuang Road. Prior to the murder, Phang was said to have broke up with him in favour of another man and a heartbroken Kwan tried to make her come back to his side by threatening to kill himself in front of her, to which Phang coldly and callously insulted him for being useless and more inferior to her new boyfriend, with whom she was much happier with. Kwan was thus provoked into killing Phang and had stabbed her multiple times before he attempted to kill himself, and the police managed to intervene and arrest him before he could. On 25 April 1997, the judge acquitted Kwan of capital murder and instead found Kwan guilty of culpable homicide after accepting that Kwan could not be held fully accountable for his actions due to the killing being a product of "a grave and sudden provocation" and loss of self control. Consequently, Kwan was sentenced to ten years in jail. On 20 January 1998, the prosecution lost their appeal against Kwan's acquittal for murder, but the Court of Appeal, having observed the extreme violence and harrowness of Kwan's outburst during the crime, decided to increase Kwan's "manifestly inadequate" ten-year sentence to life imprisonment.
 6 November 1996: 28-year-old Lim Hock Hin Kelvin was arrested following a police report that he had allegedly sexually abused five boys (including his two godsons) ranging from the ages of 9 to 13 for over a year before his arrest. Lim was charged for illegally having unnatural sex with the minors, whom he enticed with gifts and free tuition before convincing them to allow him to perform sex on them. Lim, who had two previous convictions for such offences in 1988 and 1993 (for the first, he spent 18 months in prison and for the second, he served a jail sentence of 32 months), had in fact was only out of jail for only four months when he reoffended again. In June 1997, Lim pleaded guilty to 10 charges of unnatural sex, with another 30 charges against him. A psychiatrist, Dr Liow Pei Hsiang, assessed him and she found that Lim was a paedophile and had a sexual interest in young boys, and she told the court that his condition showed a high chance of reoffending. Bearing this in mind, on 29 August 1997, High Court judge T. S. Sinnathuray sentenced Lim to four consecutive terms of 10 years, effectively making Lim serve a total of 40 years in prison. The Court of Appeal later dismissed Lim's appeal and finalized his 40-year sentence. In their landmark ruling of Lim's appeal, the appeal judges decreed that for future cases of chronic paedophiles and sex offenders who were incapable of or unwilling to control themselves and targeted children as their victims should be liable to the maximum term of life imprisonment. Lim's High Court trial was the last major case heard by High Court judge Sinnathuray before his retirement three weeks after Lim's sentencing.

1997
 13 March 1997: 53-year-old Sivapackiam Veerappan Rengasamy was found dead in a flat at King George's Avenue. The police then interviewed Sivapackiam's 36-year-old tenant Gerardine Andrew, who told them that when she returned home after visiting her son, a group of two men and a woman suddenly came to the flat, apparently to rob her and her landlady. According to Andrew's statements, the trio had restrained Sivapackiam and threatened her with a knife to look for valuables, but she was later told to leave after she failed to locate any valuables. With this information, the police arrested the three robbers – 23-year-old Mansoor Abdullah, 28-year-old Nazar Mohamed Kassim, and 22-year-old Kamala Rani Balakrishnan. All three admitted to the robbery and revealed that Andrew was the mastermind. Andrew later confessed that she had collaborated with the trio to rob her landlady, but insisted that she had no intention of causing death. Nevertheless, she was charged with murder along with Mansoor and Nazar. In February 1998, the two men were condemned to hang for the murder, while Andrew was sentenced to eight years in prison for a reduced charge of culpable homicide not amounting to murder. The prosecution filed an appeal against her conviction and sentence. On 9 September 1998, the Court of Appeal accepted the prosecution's appeal and sentenced Andrew to death. On 26 February 1999, the three were hanged in Changi Prison. As for Kamala, she was sentenced to seven years' jail for conspiring to rob and murder the victim.
 20 June 1997: In a case known as the "Duck Den murder", 19-year-old Malaysian national Lim Chin Chong murdered his 65-year-old employer, Phillip Low Cheng Quee, who operated a "duck den", a brothel with male prostitutes. Lim fled to Malaysia and was on the run for nearly 20 days, seeking refuge in the homes of his acquaintances and relatives before his arrest by the Royal Malaysia Police on 9 July 1997. He was later extradited to Singapore and charged with the murder of Low. On 1 December 1997, High Court judge Kan Ting Chiu found Lim guilty of murder and sentenced him to death. Lim's appeal against the sentence was later dismissed and he was hanged on 23 October 1998.

1998
 6 January 1998: A naked body was found dead in bushes near Woodlands MRT station. The body belonged to 19-year-old hotel receptionist Dini Haryati. Dini, who was a black belt in karate and taekwondo, was being raped and murdered, and her cause of death was a fatal skull fracture. As of 2022, her murderer(s) was never caught.
 11 January 1998: 26-year-old Iordanka Apostolova, a student from Bulgaria, was involved in an argument with 22-year-old Shaiful Edham bin Adam at a housing unit in Depot Road. Shaiful used a parang to cut Apostolova's throat with the help of his friend, 26-year-old Norishyam bin Mohamed Ali. Shaiful's wife, Hezlinda binte A. Rahman, assisted the two of them in disposing Apostolova's body at a canal near Tanah Merah Ferry Road. Apostolova's body was discovered on 13 January, which led to the arrests of Shaiful and Hezlinda. Norishyam surrendered to the police shortly after. On 14 August 1998, the High Court found Shaiful and Norishyam guilty of murder and sentenced them to death. They were hanged on 2 July 1999. Hezlinda was sentenced to six years' imprisonment for helping to dispose Apostolova's body, as well as failing to report the murder to the police.
 20 April 1998: 23-year-old Malaysian national Jonaris Badlishah killed 42-year-old Sally Poh Bee Eng by repeatedly bashing her on the head with a hammer and robbed her of a Rolex watch. Two days before the incident, he had seen Poh wearing the watch and planned to rob her so that he could give the watch to his girlfriend, 31-year-old Thai prostitute Saifon Ngammoo. On 8 December 1998, High Court judge Amarjeet Singh rejected Jonaris's defence that he suffered from a mental disorder and found him guilty of premeditated murder. Jonaris was thus sentenced to death and lost his appeal on 24 February 1999 and subsequently, he was hanged.
 August 1998: Allan Tan Kei Loon, an 18-year-old gang member who killed a rival gang member during a gang fight that erupted from earlier gang conflicts, was found guilty of culpable homicide not amounting to murder. The High Court sentenced Tan to seven years' imprisonment and nine strokes of the cane despite the prosecution's arguments for life imprisonment, which would mean behind bars for the rest of the convict's natural life due to Abdul Nasir Amer Hamsah's landmark appeal the year before. In October 1998, the prosecution's appeal for a life term was rejected, but the Court of Appeal increased Tan's sentence to ten years' imprisonment and 15 strokes of the cane.
 26 August 1998: 50-year-old Lily Tan Eng Yan was violently hacked to death in her flat in Tampines. Her hands had been nearly chopped off and she had sustained over 58 injuries, of which four were fatal. S$6,600 worth of coins and S$2,200 worth of cash were also missing from her flat. Over the next five days, the police questioned Tan's acquaintances at the market where she worked. Eventually, 46-year-old Lau Lee Peng, one of Tan's close friends, confessed that he had killed Tan with the aid of an accomplice known as "Ah Meng". A few days after his arrest, Lau changed his statement and claimed that he committed the murder alone. It turned out that Lau, who had run up huge debts from compulsive gambling, had robbed and killed Tan after learning about her wealth as he desperately needed to pay his debts. On 12 November 1999, Lau was found guilty of murder and sentenced to death. Through his lawyer Subhas Anandan, Lau tried to overturn the death sentence but the Court of Appeal dismissed his appeal in March 2000, and he was hanged on 1 September 2000.

1999
 28 January 1999: 16-year-old Siddharth Mujumdar, then a secondary school student, was found guilty of committing multiple sexual assaults of underaged females prior, as well as theft and causing hurt. His sexual offences, which were committed in Yishun, had terrorized members of the community in Yishun and Siddharth became known as the "Terror of Yishun". For his crimes, Siddharth was sentenced to three years' reformative training and he later lost his appeal in May 1999. While pending his appeal, Siddharth was out on bail and returned to his former school, Anglo-Chinese School (Independent) to finish his O-levels, and with good grades, he enrolled into Catholic Junior College to begin his two-year junior college education in 2000 while in prison and was granted a supervised release at end-2000. However, in October 2001, Siddharth reoffended by committing more sexual assaults of female minors and even performed oral sex on them besides molestation. Siddharth was caught on 21 January 2002 and he was later sentenced to 18 years' imprisonment and 12 strokes of the cane in August of that same year.
 21 April 1999: 55-year-old T. Maniam was beaten to death by 25-year-old Indian national Loganatha Venkatesan and 24-year-old Chandran s/o Rajagopal in Phoenix Garden. The brutal killing was witnessed by Fairos Banu, Maniam's stepdaughter, and two others. Loganatha and Chandran were arrested and charged with murder. Maniam's second wife and Fairos's mother, 51-year-old Julaiha Begum, was also arrested for plotting to murder her husband so she could gain full ownership of their house and the proceeds from selling the house. Julaiha had plotted with Loganatha, Chandran and a third accomplice, 28-year-old Govindasamy Ravichandran, to murder her husband. They had hired a truck driver known as Mani to drive them to Maniam's house to murder him. After two failed attempts, Govindasamy backed out of the plan and fled to India. They succeeded on their third attempt. During the trial, Loganatha and Chandran denied killing Maniam and put the blame on Mani, while Julaiha denied her involvement and attempted to discredit testimonies against her made by her daughters (Fairos and Sairah) and Govindasamy. On 14 March 2000, High Court judge Choo Han Teck found the trio found guilty of murder and sentenced them to death. Their subsequent appeals to the Court of Appeal were unsuccessful, and the trio were eventually hanged on 16 February 2001. , Mani is still at large.
 9 September 1999: At Sian Tuan Avenue, the 14-year-old daughter of a car dealer was kidnapped by 33 year-old Vincent Lee Chuan Leong and his two accomplices from China – 26-year-old Zhou Jian Guang and 29-year-old Shi Song Jing. They kept the girl in a rented house and demanded S$500,000 for her release. They eventually agreed to settle for S$330,000, which was paid to them before she was released on the morning of 12 September 1999. 20 minutes after the girl was released, the police arrested Lee at his flat. Zhou and Shi were separately arrested on 14 September 1999. On 4 May 2000, High Court judge Chan Seng Onn found the trio guilty of kidnapping and sentenced them to life imprisonment. A 2021 YouTube video revealed that Lee had been released from prison on parole for good behaviour on 22 June 2020 and had found a job as a lorry driver.
 15 December 1999 – 2 January 2000: 14-year-old Ong Li Xia called her 14-year-old friend to her flat and confined her there for 17 days. During that period, the victim suffered extreme abuse and humiliation at the hands of Ong, Ong's three sisters aged between 11 and 17, and the three sisters' boyfriends, all aged 17. At one point, she was forced to perform oral sex on a dog. After the victim was released, she was hospitalised for severe injuries which had left her traumatised and maimed for life. The seven perpetrators – the four Ong sisters, Yeo Kim Han, Neo Soo Kai and Melvin Yeo Yew Beng – were arrested and charged with multiple offences related to unlawful confinement and causing grievous hurt. During the trial, it was revealed that the Ong sisters' mother neglected them as she was busy working at a karaoke lounge while their father was in jail for a drug offence. All seven of them were eventually sentenced to jail terms of between two and seven years for the respective charges they faced. The three boys were also sentenced to between 12 and 16 strokes of the cane each for their crimes.

See also
 Capital punishment in Singapore
 Life imprisonment in Singapore
 List of major crimes in Singapore (2000–present)

References

 
Major crimes
Major crimes